Slug line may refer to:
Slugging, a form of commuting
Screenplay slug line, in film industry
Slugline (software), in screenwriting software
Slug Line, John Hiatt's third album
Slugline, a fictional political blog in the US television series House of Cards